Dyscia atlantica is a species of moth from the family Geometridae. The scientific name of this species was first published in 1933 by Reisser. It is found in Morocco.

Larvae have been reared on Artemisia campestris.

References

Dyscia
Moths described in 1933